Phocas Software is a business intelligence software company headquartered in Sydney, Australia. It has offices in Orange and Melbourne, Christchurch, in New Zealand, Coventry, in the United Kingdom and Irvine and Reno in the United States.

The company works to a growth and retention strategy. It has a growth rate of 22% YoY and is set to increase via new verticals. Phocas employs 200 people and has 2000 customers globally. Total license revenue is $AU42M in FY20 (with 81% recurring revenue).

History 
Phocas was founded in Oxford, England, in 1999. Led by co-founders Paul Magee, Sean Morley, Chris Howard, Harold Roffey and Myles Glashier, the software development commenced that same year in Collaroy, Australia.  

 2001 – Phocas officially launched in the United Kingdom
 2001 – Version 1 of Phocas Data Analytics was created
 2003 – Phocas Australia was set-up 
 2006 – Phocas America established
 2013 – 100th customer signed, Phocas moves into the cloud
 2014 – New research & development centre established at Orange 
 2015 – Netsuite partnership established. 100 employees 
 2016 – Phocas 2016 released – accessible anywhere, anytime. Epicor partnership secured to become the white label provider for Epicor data analytics powered by Phocas. 
 2017 – Rebates solutions released. Staff shareplan opens. 
 2018 – Michelle Deaker, a leading technology expert appointed to the board 
 2019 – Phocas has ongoing partnerships with ERP publishers including Epicor, MAM, Merlin, Sanderson, MYOB, Acumatica, Infor, Sage, SAP, Oracle and value-add resellers, like Kilimanjaro, Leverage Technologies, Aktion Associates, NSA, Bright Bridge Solutions and SBK to promote and sell its data analytics solution to manufacturers, distributors and retailers worldwide.
2020 – Financial Statements product released allowing finance teams to more readily analyse financial data and share performance with the whole team. New development hub established in Christchurch. Phocas celebrates the milestone of 200 people employed. Budgeting and Forecasting product to release next year, to complement the focus on bringing BI to finance.

Product 
Phocas is developed using a .NET business layer with HTML5+JavaScript presentation layer accessible via standard web browsers. The application is deployed (on premise or cloud) via MS IIS and backed ended on MS SQL databases. Some services are accessed inside the product including Google Geocaching and AWS AI algorithms. 

Phocas supports on-premise, hybrid and cloud (multi-tenant) deployment options for customers. For the hybrid and cloud offerings, Phocas works with cloud providers and security partners Rackspace and Amazon Web Services.  

The Phocas product provides storage for the creation and build of databases. This storage is a standard part of the Phocas product design and enables users to analyse pre-created databases or create their own on-demand.

Industry recognition 

 In 2020, Phocas named the NO. 1 business intelligence software product in the FrontRunners guide by Software Advice.
In 2020, Phocas featured in the Australian Financial Review technology section as a profitable and growing data analytics company with a bright future.
In 2019, Phocas won a Culture Transformation Award from Human Synergistics for its constructive and positive culture.
In 2019, Phocas has a 4.8/5 ranking on Capterra, a leading independent review site. 
In 2018, Phocas ranked number 1 in 28 categories, with a leading position in another 25 categories across three peer groups in the Business Application Research Center's BARC BI survey, the world's largest business intelligence software review.  
In 2016, Phocas achieved a No. 1 ranking in 16 categories, with a leading position in another 24 categories in the Business Application Research Center's BARC BI survey, the world's largest business intelligence software review.
 In 2015, Phocas ranked number 1 in 8 categories, with a leading position in another 15 categories in the Business Application Research Center's BARC BI survey, the world's largest business intelligence software review.
 The company was rated as a leader in business benefits in the Gartner Magic Quandrant 2015. It was also ranked in a high position for Product Quality, Ease of Use and Market Understanding.
 In 2015, Phocas was ranked number 497 in the Deloitte Technology Fast 500, an annual index of the fastest growing technology companies in Asia-Pacific.
 Phocas earned leader status and received the highest overall satisfaction ratings for business intelligence software in the G2Crowd winter 2015 report.
 In 2014, Phocas was voted number 1 in 13 categories, with a leading position in another 26 categories in the BARC BI survey.
 In 2014, Phocas was ranked number 48 in the Deloitte Technology Fast 50, an annual index of the fastest growing technology companies in Australia.

Phocas User Group Awards  
Winners of the 2021 Puggy  Phocas User Group Award: 
 Champion – Pete Racz  Arizona Tile
 Innovation – Dominic Vicchiollo  Dakota Supply Group
 Growth – Parrish-Hare / Power-House Electrical Supply
 Networking – Lori Redmond  Crescent Electric Supply

References

Business intelligence software
1999 establishments in England
Software companies of the United Kingdom
Reporting software
Data analysis software
Business intelligence companies